Clusia plurivalvis is a species of flowering plant in the family Clusiaceae. It is found only in Ecuador. Its natural habitat is subtropical or tropical moist montane forest.

References

plurivalvis
Endemic flora of Ecuador
Endangered plants
Taxonomy articles created by Polbot